Linda Flores (born 1947) is an American Republican politician who served in the Oregon House of Representatives from 2003 until 2009.

Career
Flores was first elected to the Oregon House in 2002, defeating Democratic incumbent Jan Lee. She was reelected in 2004 and 2006, however lost to Democrat Brent Barton in 2008.

Personal life
Flores and her husband, Armando Flores, have five children and ten grandchildren.

References

Living people
1947 births
Republican Party members of the Oregon House of Representatives
Portland State University alumni
Politicians from Portland, Oregon
People from Clackamas, Oregon
21st-century American politicians